Cyclops bicuspidatus is a planktonic species of copepod found throughout the world, except Australia, and characteristic of the Great Lakes of North America. It is a deep water species found throughout the year with peak abundance occurring in May or June.

Distribution and classification
C. bicuspidatus has a cosmopolitan distribution, although several of its subspecies are more restricted, possibly representing cryptic species. For example, most specimens from North America can be ascribed to C. b. thomasi (= Diacyclops thomasi), while C. b. limnoria is restricted to Lake Constance. Taxonomy within the group is uncertain, and some subspecies may even belong to different genera.

Ecology
In the Great Lakes, C. bicuspidatus is herbivorous until the fourth instar and omnivorous thereafter. Its prey includes ciliates, rotifers, small cladocera, young copepods and fish larvae. In turn, C. bicuspidatus is eaten by fish including the alewife, bass, bloaters, ciscoes, carpsuckers, perch, sculpin, shiners, whitefish and walleyes. In Lake Ontario, the population of C. bicuspidatus declined significantly after the invasive cladoceran Cercopagis pengoi was introduced.

References

Cyclopidae
Freshwater crustaceans
Crustaceans described in 1857